Neeta Lulla is an Indian fashion designer. She designed for films like Lamhe (1990), Devdas (2002 Hindi film) (2002), and Jodhaa Akbar. She gained National Film Award for Best Costume Design four times, for the above films and Balgandharva (2010).

National Film Awards

Filmfare Awards
The Filmfare Awards are one of the oldest and most prestigious Hindi film awards. They are presented annually by The Times Group for excellence of cinematic achievements. Lulla received two nominations.

Bollywood Movie Awards

IIFA Awards

Zee Cine Awards

Kingfisher Fashion Award
Winner - Special Honorary Award (2005)

India Leadership Conclave
Winner - Fashion Designer of the Decade (2016)

References

Lulla, Neeta